Walthamstow by-election may refer to:

 1897 Walthamstow by-election
 1910 Walthamstow by-election
 1969 Walthamstow East by-election
 1956 Walthamstow West by-election
 1967 Walthamstow West by-election